The Bonn Zoological Bulletin (BzB), formerly Bonner zoologische Beiträge, is a peer reviewed open access journal dealing with zoology.

References

External links

Zoology journals